
Marcus Minucius Felix (died c. 250 AD in Rome) was one of the earliest of the Latin apologists for Christianity.

Nothing is known of his personal history, and even the date at which he wrote can be only approximately ascertained as between AD 150 and 270. Jerome's De Viris Illustribus No. 58 speaks of him as "Romae insignis causidicus" [one of Rome's notable solicitors], but in that he is probably only improving on the expression of Lactantius who speaks of him as "non-ignobilis inter causidicos loci" [not unknown among solicitors].

Octavius 
He is now exclusively known by his Octavius, a dialogue on Christianity between the pagan Caecilius Natalis and the Christian Octavius Januarius. Written for educated non-Christians, the arguments are borrowed chiefly from Cicero, especially his De natura deorum ("Concerning the Nature of the Gods"), and Christian material, mainly from the Greek Apologists.

The Octavius is admittedly earlier than Cyprian's Quod idola dei non-sint, which borrows from it; how much earlier can be determined only by settling the relation in which it stands to Tertullian's Apologeticum.

The name Caecilius Natalis contains the nomen Caecilius and cognomen Natalis, which may refer to the gens Caecilia, a plebeian family at Rome.

The name Octavius Januarius contains the nomen Octavius and cognomen Januarius, which may refer to the gens Octavia – the family name of Emperor Augustus.

Minucia Gens 
The name of Marcus Minucius Felix indicates his association with the gens Minucia.

Stoic Influence 
Stoic influences can also be seen in his work.

Notes

References

External links 

 
 Opera Omnia by Migne Patrologia Latina with analytical indexes
 

250 deaths
2nd-century Latin writers
2nd-century Romans
3rd-century Latin writers
3rd-century Romans
Ancient Roman writers
Christian apologists
Christians in the Roman Empire
Felix, Marcus
Post–Silver Age Latin writers
Year of birth unknown